Yuriy Valeryevich Nikiforov (alternate spelling Valeriovych; , ; born 16 September 1970) is a professional football coach and a former player who played mainly as a central defender.

Club career
Born in Odessa, Ukraine, Soviet Union, Nikiforov started playing professionally with hometown's FC Chornomorets. After one year with FC Dynamo Kyiv in which he appeared solely for the reserves he returned to his first club, playing in the inaugural edition of the Ukrainian Premier League.

In early 1993, Nikiforov moved to Russia with FC Spartak Moscow, being an instrumental defensive unit as the capital side won three out of four Premier League titles, with the player also netting regularly. His first abroad experience came with Sporting de Gijón, to where he arrived at the same time as former compatriot Dmitri Cheryshev (he would also share team with another Russian while in Asturias, Igor Lediakhov).

After Gijón's relegation from La Liga, Nikiforov played five years in the Netherlands, starting with PSV Eindhoven which he helped to consecutive Eredivisie accolades. For 2002–03, the 32-year-old signed with lowly RKC Waalwijk also in the Dutch top level, with the club finishing in a comfortable ninth place. He finished his career in Japan, after one year with Urawa Red Diamonds.

International career
Nikiforov played four times for the Commonwealth of Independent States in 1992, as the national team that rose from the ashes of the Soviet Union took part in that year's UEFA European Championship – he did not make the squad for the finals. His debut came on 25 January in a 1–0 friendly with the United States, in Miami.

After briefly representing Ukraine, also in that year, Nikiforov switched to Russia, with which he would participate in two FIFA World Cups – 1994 and 2002 – as well as UEFA Euro 1996 (eight matches in total, but with the national side always exiting in the group stage).

In 2009, Nikiforov was part of the Russian squad that won the Legends Cup.

Coaching career
After retiring, he became a coach, following his former PSV teammate Dmitri Khokhlov as an assistant to FC Kuban Krasnodar and FC Dynamo Moscow in the Russian Premier League.

On 12 August 2022, he was hired as an assistant to Valeri Karpin in the Russia national football team.

Personal life
Nikiforov's older brother, Oleksandr, was also a footballer. He too represented Chornomorets (four different spells), and coincided with Yuri from 1989–90.

Career statistics

Club

National team

Honours

Club
Chornomorets Odesa
Ukrainian Cup (1): 1992

Spartak Moscow
Russian Football Premier League (3): 1993, 1994, 1996
Russian Cup (1): 1994

PSV Eindhoven
Eredivisie (2): 1999–2000, 2000–01
Johan Cruyff Shield (3):1998, 2000, 2001

Country
Soviet Union
FIFA U-16 World Cup (1): 1987
UEFA European Under-18 Championship (1): 1988

Russia
Legends Cup (2): 2009, 2010

References

External links
RussiaTeam biography and profile 

Beijen profile 

1970 births
Living people
Ukrainian emigrants to Russia
Naturalised citizens of Russia
Footballers from Odesa
Soviet footballers
Ukrainian footballers
Russian footballers
Association football defenders
Soviet Top League players
Soviet Second League players
Ukrainian Premier League players
Russian Premier League players
Russian Second League players
FC Dynamo Kyiv players
FC Chornomorets Odesa players
SKA Odesa players
FC Spartak Moscow players
FC Spartak-2 Moscow players
La Liga players
Sporting de Gijón players
Eredivisie players
PSV Eindhoven players
RKC Waalwijk players
J1 League players
Urawa Red Diamonds players
Soviet Union under-21 international footballers
Soviet Union international footballers
Ukraine international footballers
Russia international footballers
Dual internationalists (football)
1994 FIFA World Cup players
UEFA Euro 1996 players
2002 FIFA World Cup players
Russian expatriate footballers
Expatriate footballers in Spain
Russian expatriate sportspeople in Spain
Expatriate footballers in the Netherlands
Expatriate footballers in Japan
Russian expatriate sportspeople in the Netherlands
Russian expatriate sportspeople in Japan
Russian football managers
Russian expatriate football managers
Expatriate football managers in Kazakhstan
Russian expatriate sportspeople in Kazakhstan